Stein's rat (Rattus steini), also known as the small spiny rat, is a species of rodent in the family Muridae. 
It is found in West Papua, Indonesia and Papua New Guinea.

Subspecies
Subspecies include:

References

Taylor, J.M., Calaby, J.H. & Van Deusen, H.M. 1982. A revision of the genus Rattus (Rodentia, Muridae) in the New Guinean region. Bulletin of the American Museum of Natural History 173:177-336.

Rattus
Rodents of Papua New Guinea
Mammals of Western New Guinea
Mammals described in 1935
Taxonomy articles created by Polbot
Rodents of New Guinea
Taxa named by Hans Rümmler